Prodoxus tamaulipellus is a moth of the family Prodoxidae. It is found in thorn scrub interspersed with grasslands in the Tamaulipan biotic province which spans the borders of the southern United States and northern Mexico.

The wingspan is 8.4-11.1 mm for males and 9.4-12.5 for females. The forewings are white with speckles of brown along the costa and a dark brown discal spot. The hindwings are gray, but darker along the outer edge. Adults are on wing from late February to early March.

The larvae feed on Yucca treculeana and Yucca filifera. They feed in a gallery inside the fruit wall of developing fruit of their host. Larval cohorts of the species emerge as adults over at least two years even when artificial winter and water is provided.

Etymology
The species is named for the Tamaulipan biotic province, which contains the known sites for the species.

References

Moths described in 2005
Prodoxidae